The Territorial Defence Force – TDF is the fifth military branch of the Polish Armed Forces, following Land Forces, Air Force, Navy and Special Forces. The force is made up of professional and part-time volunteer soldiers, forming part of the country's defence and deterrence system. Formed in 2016, it had reached 24,000 personnel by July 2019, and was slated to reach a size of around 53,000 personnel in 17 light infantry brigades by 2021. The creation of the Polish TDF relates to the reforms in the Baltic states' Territorial Defence Forces to provide response during the early stages of a hybrid conflict.

History

The Territorial Defence Force is a planned reserve component of Poland's military. A similar, identically named organization had existed in the country since 1965, but was disbanded in 2008 as part of a modernization program. The re-creation of the Territorial Defence Force was first announced in 2015 in reaction to the war in Donbass and concern that Poland's existing military would be ill-equipped to confront an adversary under similar conditions of low-intensity conflict. According to government officials, public reception to the idea was positive with 11,000 persons registering interest in joining the force within the first few months after the initial announcement. The program was subsequently formalized with the signing of "a new document concerning the functioning of the territorial defense concept" by Minister of Defence of Poland Antoni Macierewicz in a ceremony held at Warsaw's Waldemar Milewicz General Secondary School on April 27, 2016.

On May 21, 2017 in Bialystok, Lublin and Rzeszow took place the first military oath in the history of WOT.

On the basis of Decision No. 140 / MON of the Minister of National Defense of 28 June 2017, TDF was declared the successor to the traditions of the Home Army National Command (1942–1945) of the Second World War, while being the de facto successor to the heritage of its forebears.

Organization

Plans announced in January 2016 called for what officials said would eventually become a 46,000-man contingent, though initially the WOT would consist of just three brigades sited in the north east of the country and funded with an annual appropriation of approximately €60 million; it was later reported the force would have a maximum size of 35,000 personnel. As envisaged, the Territorial Defence Force is to be a part-time, all-volunteer organization, with soldiers receiving 30 days of military training per year. Unlike existing reserve forces, which upon mobilization are integrated into regular components of the Polish military, the Territorial Defence Force will be designed to operate autonomously in home areas and with personnel drawn from the local population. According to Polish military planners, this set-up would be most effective in countering hybrid warfare. As part of the Ministry of Defense acquisition plans for 2017–2022, the total number of volunteers was set to 50,000 and a budget of 3.2 billion zloty outlaid to arm and equip them.

Besides responding to external military threats, the WOT will, according to the Defense Ministry, help strengthen Poland's "patriotic and Christian foundations".

Poland is divided into 16 Voivodeships. The Territorial Defence Troops follow the administrative division with a brigade formed in each voievodship. The exception is the Masovian, which has two territorial defence brigades due to the significance of the capital Warsaw. For mobilisation duties and liaison to the local authorities there is a Voievodship Military Staff in each of the 16 voievodships and the territorial brigades' HQs are located nearby. The commander of the Territorial Defence Troops is a division general and the brigades are commanded by colonels.

 HQ in Warsaw
 1st Podlaska Territorial Defence Brigade "Col. Władysław Liniarski „Mścisław”" in Białystok
 11th Light Infantry Battalion in Białystok
 12th Light Infantry Battalion in Suwałki
 13th Light Infantry Battalion in Łomża
 14th Light Infantry Battalion in Bielsk Podlaski
 2nd Lublin Territorial Defence Brigade "Maj. Hieronim Dekutowski „Zapora”" in Lublin
 21st Light Infantry Battalion in Lublin
 22nd Light Infantry Battalion in Dęblin
 23rd Light Infantry Battalion in Biała Podlaska
 24th Light Infantry Battalion in Chełm
 25th Light Infantry Battalion in Zamość
 3rd Podkarpacka Territorial Defence Brigade "Col. Łukasz Ciepliński" in Rzeszów
 31st Light Infantry Battalion in Rzeszów
 32nd Light Infantry Battalion in Nisko
 33rd Light Infantry Battalion in Dębica
 34th Light Infantry Battalion in Jarosław
 35th Light Infantry Battalion in Sanok
 4th Warmian-Masurian Territorial Defence Brigade "Capt. Gracjan Klaudiusz Fróg „Szczerbiec”" in Olsztyn
 41st Light Infantry Battalion in Giżycko
 42nd Light Infantry Battalion in Morąg
 43rd Light Infantry Battalion in Braniewo
 44th Light Infantry Battalion in Ełk
 45th Light Infantry Battalion in Olsztyn
 5th Masovian Territorial Defence Brigade "1Lt. Mieczysław Dziemieszkiewicz „Rój”" in Ciechanów (covering Northern Masovia)
 51st Light Infantry Battalion in Ciechanów
 52nd Light Infantry Battalion in Komorowo
 53rd Light Infantry Battalion in Siedlce
 54th Light Infantry Battalion in Zegrze Południowe
 6th Masovian Territorial Defence Brigade "Rotmistrz Witold Pilecki" in Radom
 61st Light Infantry Battalion in Grójec
 62nd Light Infantry Battalion in Radom
 Light Infantry Battalion in Płock
 Light Infantry Battalion in Książenice
 Light Infantry Battalion in Pomiechówek
 7th Pomeranian Territorial Defence Brigade in Gdańsk
 71st Light Infantry Battalion in Malbork
 72nd Light Infantry Battalion in Kościerzyna
 73rd Light Infantry Battalion in Słupsk
 8th Kuyavian-Pomeranian Territorial Defence Brigade "Brig. Gen. Elżbieta Zawacka „Zo”" in Bydgoszcz
 81st Light Infantry Battalion in Toruń
 82nd Light Infantry Battalion in Inowrocław
 83rd Light Infantry Battalion in Grudziądz
 9th Łódź Territorial Defence Brigade in Łódź
 91st Light Infantry Battalion in Zgierz
 92nd Light Infantry Battalion in Kutno
 93rd Light Infantry Battalion in Łask
 94th Light Infantry Battalion in Piotrków Trybunalski
 10th Świętokrzyska Territorial Defence Brigade "Maj. Eugeniusz Gedymin Kaszyński „Nurt”" in Kielce
 101st Light Infantry Battalion in Kielce
 102nd Light Infantry Battalion in Sandomierz
 103rd Light Infantry Battalion in Ostrowiec Świętokrzyski
 11th Lesser Poland Territorial Defence Brigade in Kraków
 111st Light Infantry Battalion in Rząska
 112nd Light Infantry Battalion in Oświęcim
 12th Greater Poland Territorial Defence Brigade in Poznań
 151st Light Infantry Battalion in Skwierzyna
 121st Light Infantry Battalion in Poznań (Ławica)
 122nd Light Infantry Battalion in Dolaszewo
 123rd Light Infantry Battalion in Turek
 124th Light Infantry Battalion in Śrem
 125th Light Infantry Battalion in Leszno
 13th Silesian Territorial Defence Brigade in Katowice
 131st Light Infantry Battalion in Gliwice
 132nd Light Infantry Battalion in Częstochowa
 133rd Light Infantry Battalion in Cieszyn
 134th Light Infantry Battalion in Kuźnia Raciborska
 171st Light Infantry Battalion in Brzeg
 14th West Pomeranian Territorial Defence Brigade in Szczecin
 141st Light Infantry Battalion in Choszczno
 142nd Light Infantry Battalion in Trzebiatów
 16th Lower Silesian Territorial Defence Brigade in Wrocław
 161st Light Infantry Battalion in Wrocław/Kłodzko
 162nd Light Infantry Battalion in Głogów

Each brigade also has a command, a support, a sapper and a logistic company, carrying the brigade's number.

Tasks of the Territorial Defense Forces 

The Territorial Defense Forces are dedicated to:
 Conducting defense activities in cooperation with the Operational Forces and supporting elements of the non-military system.
 Carrying out unconventional activities, anti-sabotage and offensive landing.
 Participate in safeguarding the reception and development of allied reinforcement forces in commanded areas.
 Implementation of projects in the area of: crisis management, the eradication of natural disasters and the elimination of their effects, property protection, search and rescue operations.

See also
 Polish Land Forces
 Lithuanian National Defence Volunteer Forces
 Territorial Defense Forces (Ukraine)
 Home Guard

References

Military units and formations of Poland
Polish Land Forces
Militias in Europe
2017 establishments in Poland